Opera Mail (formerly known as M2) is the email and news client developed by Opera Software. It was an integrated component within the Opera web browser from version 2 through 12. With the release of Opera 15 in 2013, Opera Mail became a separate product and is no longer bundled with Opera. Opera Mail version 1.0 is available for OS X and Windows. It features rich text support and inline spell checking, spam filtering (both automated and Bayesian), a contact manager, and supports POP3 and IMAP, newsgroups, and Atom and RSS feeds.

Opera Mail uses one database that keeps an index of all mail and sorts the messages automatically into several "views" or access points. Messages are automatically sorted by types, such as mailing lists, and mail with attachments. This approach to indexing allows for quicker access to messages. For instance, a message sent to a mailing list with a word document attached will appear in both the "Documents" attachment view and in the "Mailing lists" view. Opera Mail can also use Bayesian filtering to automatically sort messages into other views. All messages in the database are accessed by opening the "Received" view.

The integrated mail component included a simple IRC client, but this is no longer present in the standalone program. The IRC client supported multiple servers, file transfers, and interface customization through CSS.

Opera Mail can display text and HTML emails and uses the Presto layout engine to display HTML.

Opera Mail is at the end-of-life stage of its product lifecycle; this means neither technical support nor product and security updates will be provided. The product is no longer available for download. Users of Opera Mail who have large amounts of email and would like to utilize 64-bit performance can use the 64-bit build of the Opera Web Browser, which is the same code contained in the standalone email client. 

In November 2020, Vivaldi has launched a Technical Preview of its email client, Vivaldi Mail which many users have considered it to be a spiritual successor to Opera M2.

See also
Comparison of email clients
Comparison of feed aggregators
Comparison of Usenet newsreaders

References

Freeware
Email client software for Linux
MacOS email clients
Opera Software
Usenet clients
Windows email clients
Proprietary freeware for Linux